Andrew John Lynch (born 20 October 1979) is an English former professional rugby league footballer who played as a  for the Castleford Tigers (Heritage № 759), Bradford Bulls and Hull F.C. in the Super League, and England and Great Britain at international level.

Playing career

Castleford
Lynch started his career at the Castleford Tigers in 1999. Lynch was named in the England 'A' squad for their match against New Zealand, and for the South Seas tour at the end of the 2002's Super League VII, and the following year was part of the squad that won the European Nations Cup.

In 2003, he was selected in the Super League Dream Team. In the same year Lynch was also awarded the Tigers Player of the Year award. During his time at Castleford, Lynch was also selected for England, and played as a substitute in Yorkshire's 56-6 victory over Lancashire at Odsal Stadium, Bradford on 2 July 2003.

Bradford Bulls

Lynch signed for the Bradford Bulls in 2004, following Castleford's relegation from the Super League. As 2005 Super League champions, Bradford faced National Rugby League premiers Wests Tigers in the 2006 World Club Challenge. Lynch played as a prop forward in the Bulls' 30-10 victory. In 2006, he won several club awards for his performances, including Supporters' Player of the Year, Players' Player of the Year, BISA Player of the Year and Best Forward of the Year.

Lynch was called up to the Great Britain squad in 2006 for the Tri Nations tournament, although he did not feature in the tournament.

In June 2007, Lynch was again called up to the Great Britain squad for the test match against France.

Lynch also played for Northern Union side against the All Golds in October 2007.

He was forced to rule himself out contention for the England training squad for the 2008 Rugby League World Cup through injury.

Hull FC
Lynch signed for Hull F.C. on a two-year deal in September 2011 for a "significant six figure" fee. Lynch was named FC captain for the 2012 season on 19 January.

Return to Castleford
Lynch returned to Castleford in 2014 and played a major part in their season, including an appearance in the 2014 Challenge Cup Final defeat by the Leeds Rhinos at Wembley Stadium.

In June 2017, Lynch announced he would be retiring at the end of the season. He won the League Leaders' Shield with Castleford, but was not included in the squad for the 2017 Grand Final against Leeds Rhinos. He finished his career with a total of 452 Super League appearances – two games fewer than the record set by Kevin Sinfield.

Statistics

Club career

Representative career

Personal life
In 2017, Lynch joined former teammate Danny Orr as a coach at the Elite Rugby Academy.

References

External links
(archived by web.archive.org) Cas Tigers profile
(archived by web.archive.org) Bradford Bulls profile
(archived by web.archive.org) Statistics at rugby-league.com

1979 births
Living people
Bradford Bulls captains
Bradford Bulls players
Castleford Tigers players
England national rugby league team players
English rugby league players
Great Britain national rugby league team players
Hull F.C. players
People educated at Mount St Mary's Catholic High School, Leeds
Rugby league players from Leeds
Rugby league props
Yorkshire rugby league team players